Palo Blanco may refer to:

 Palo Blanco, Catamarca, Argentina
 Palo Blanco, Guerrero, Mexico, within Chilpancingo de los Bravo (municipality)
 Palo Blanco, Texas, United States
 Palo Blanco Airstrip, Baja California Sur, Mexico
 USS Palo Blanco (YN-85), an American ship
 Celtis reticulata, a tree native to the southwestern United States and northern Mexico sometimes known as palo blanco
 Mariosousa willardiana, a tree native to Sonora, Mexico, also known as palo blanco

See also
 Palos Blancos, Bolivia
 Palos Blancos Municipality, Bolivia
 Paso Blanco, Panama